Arun Luthra  (Hindi: अरुण लूथरा; Punjabi: ਅਰੁਣ ਲੂਥਰਾ) is a saxophonist, konnakol artist, composer, and bandleader based in New York City.

Career
He has worked with Billy Harper, Eddie Henderson, Kenny Garrett, Dennis Irwin, Joe Chambers, Charli Persip, Portinho, Zé Renato, The Temptations, The Four Tops, Frankie Valli, Bobby Short, Lew Soloff, Bernard Purdie and Ray Vega.

Luthra has also performed or studied with the Hindustani and Carnatic musicians Selvaganesh Vinayakram, Pandit Trichy Sankaran, Pandit Samir Chatterjee, Krishnan Lalgudi & Vijayalakshmi Lalgudi, Pandit Karaikudi Subramaniam, Steve Gorn, Kiran Ahluwalia, Sufi singer Zila Khan, and Asha Puthli.

Luthra was interviewed by Linus Wyrsch on The Jazz Hole for Breakthruradio.

Luthra was named the 2017-2018 composer-in-residence at Flushing Town Hall by Exploring the Metropolis. In conjunction with this he was awarded a 2018 New Work Grant by the Queens Council on the Arts to premiere the music composed during his composer residency.  In 2021 Luthra was named the Interdisciplinary Artist-in-Residence at the University of Wisconsin-Madison's Division of the Arts. In 2022 Luthra was for the second time awarded a New Work Grant by the Queens Council on the Arts – this time to continue developing his large-scale multimedia work "Many Streams One River, Many Branches One Tree".

Discography

As leader
 Tangibility (SaReGaMa, 2003)
 Louder Than Words (SaReGaMa, 2009)
 Live in New York (SaReGaMa, 2019)

As sideman
 David Rozenblatt, Dirty Wire (Mishigas Music)
 Red Baraat, Bootleg Bhangra (Sinj 2011)
 Red Baraat, Chaal Baby (Sinj, 2010)
 Red Baraat, Shruggy Ji (Sinj, 2013)
 Björkestra, Enjoy (Koch, 2008)
 Billy Fox The Uncle Wiggly Suite (Clean Feed, 2007)
 Mosaïc Orchestra, The Journey (Blue Lemon)
 New York Funk Exchange, Funkonomic Stimulus Plan (Funk In Da Trunk)
 Quimbombó, Conga Eléctrica (Testa Dura)
 David Rozenblatt, Music for Dwight Rhoden's Ballet Othello (Mishigas Music)
 Russ Spiegel Jazz Orchestra, Transplants (Ruzztone Music)
 Russ Spiegel Sextet, Chimera (Steeplechase)
 Doug Lawrence & His Orchestra, Big Band Swing
 New York Funk Exchange, Funkanomic Stimulus Plan
 Karl Wenninger's Wake Up Call, Wake Up Call (Bancroft)
 Broadway's Greatest Gift: Carols For A Cure, Vol. 9
 Charlie Porter Septet E.P.
 Dan Brodsky, Up In the Air E.P.

References

External links
 
 Arun Luthra on YouTube
 Arun Luthra's Konnakol Jazz Project

American jazz musicians
American jazz composers
American male jazz composers
American male musicians of Indian descent
American musicians of Indian descent
Living people
Place of birth missing (living people)
Year of birth missing (living people)